Walter Martin may refer to:

 General Walter Martin (1764–1834), founder of Martinsburg, New York
Gen. Walter Martin House, a historic home located at Martinsburg  in Lewis County, New York
 Walter Ralston Martin (1928–1989), American Evangelical minister, author, and Christian apologist
Walter Martin (musician), American singer-songwriter and member of The Walkmen
Walter Martin (rugby union) (1883–1933), Wales international rugby union player
Walter Martin (cyclist) (1891–1966) (aka Walden Martin), American road racing cyclist
Walter Martin, half of artists Martin & Muñoz
Walter Stillman Martin, Christian minister and husband of Civilla D. Martin